The History of Jews in Oregon goes back to before Oregon was granted statehood and has gone through several waves of immigration. The first Jews to settle were German Reform Jews. In the Early 1900’s Jews came to Portland from Sefardic lands and Eastern Europe and Settled in Old South Portland. While there, They established several pieces of community infrastructure. The Orthodox Jewish population in Portland has increased since 2005.

Synagogues

Synagogues in Oregon include: Congregation Beth Israel(Reform), Congregation Neveh Shalom(Conservative), Congregation Shaarie Torah(Conservative), and Temple Beth Israel (Eugene), Congregation Kesser Israel(Orthodox), Congregation Ahavath Achim(Orthodox), Congregation Bais Menachem(Orthodox), and Congregation Beit Yosef(Orthodox).

People

 Ernest Bloch
 Ben Boloff
 Michael Dembrow
 Neil Goldschmidt
 Bernard Goldsmith
 Henry Heppner
 Solomon Hirsch
 Marshall Holman
 Vera Katz
 Bernard Malamud
 Julius Meier
 Harry Mittleman
 Rose Naftalin
 Richard L. Neuberger
 Mark Rothko
 Arlene Schnitzer
 Harold Schnitzer
 Mildred Schwab
 Ben Selling
 Joseph Simon
 Michael H. Simon
 Norton Simon
 Gus J. Solomon
 Vicki Stone
 Philip Wasserman
 Ron Wyden

See also

 Beth Israel Cemetery (Portland, Oregon)
 Congregation Shaarie Torah Cemetery
 Jewish Review
 Kenny & Zuke's Delicatessen
 Oregon Holocaust Memorial
 Oregon Jewish Museum
 Portland Jewish Academy

References